The 2008 CEMAC Cup was the fifth edition of the CEMAC Cup, the football championship of Central African nations.

The tournament was held from 14 June to 26 June in Yaoundé, Cameroon. The tournament was played by 6 teams composed just by players based on local clubs. The first team players active in the 2010 World Cup qualification at the same time were not involved.

First round

Group A

Group B

Knockout round

Semi-finals

3rd place playoff

Final

References
Details at RSSSF archives

CEMAC Cup
2008
CEMAC Cup, 2007
CEMAC Cup